La Sagra Musicale Malatestiana is a music festival that takes place yearly in Rimini (Italy). It encompasses a cycle of main concerts held in September, during the year there are many other collateral concerts and cultural events under the same project name.
The first edition was in 1950, Glauco Cosmi, a music enthusiast culturally active Rimini citizen, is  recognised to have been the main promoter of the festival. The venue until the early 1990s was set in the Tempio Malatestiano.

See also
Amintore Galli Theatre

References 
http://www.sagramusicalemalatestiana.it/

Music festivals in Italy